Lieutenant General Inderjit Singh Gill, PVSM, MC (16 January 1922 – 30 May 2001) was a general officer in the Indian Army. He was the officiating Director of Military Operations (DMO) of the Indian Army during the Bangladesh Liberation War. He retired in 1979 after serving as the Western Army Commander.

Early life 
Gill was born in 1922 in a Jat family of Lieutenant Colonel Gurdial Singh Gill of the Indian Medical Service and his Scottish wife, Rena Lister. Having done his schooling in India, he was studying engineering at the University of Edinburgh when the second world war broke out, and in 1941 he dropped out to enlist in the Black Watch.

Military career

World War II
He was commissioned into the Corps of Royal Engineers as a Second Lieutenant on 5 April 1942. He was promoted to Lieutenant on 5 October 1942.

The British Special Operations Executive planned Operation Animals to deceive the Axis Powers into believing that Greece was the target of an Allied amphibious landing, instead of Sicily. Gill served in this operation, for which he was awarded the Military Cross in the London Gazette of 3 February 1944 as a Lieutenant (acting Captain). His citation (which was not made public) read: 

He was also mentioned in dispatches in the London Gazette of 6 April 1944 for services in the Middle East.

Post-Independence
Just prior to India's independence, Gill relinquished his British commission and joined the Indian Army. On 7 May 1947, he was commissioned as a lieutenant in the British Indian Army (seniority from 5 July 1944) and with seniority in his former rank of second lieutenant from 5 January 1943. He was promoted to captain in the newly re-designated Indian Army on 5 January 1949.

Gill attended the Defence Services Staff College in 1954. In 1955, he took over command of the 1st battalion The Parachute regiment (1 Para), and was promoted to major on 5 January 1956. After Brigade and Division level commands, he was appointed the Director Military Training (DMT). He was the officiating Director Military Operations (DMO) during the Indo-Pakistani War of 1971.

Gill was awarded the Param Vishisht Seva Medal as a Major General in 1967 and was awarded the Padma Bhushan in 1972 for his role as the officiating Director of Military Operations in the 1971 Indo-Pak War.

After the war, Gill was promoted to lieutenant-general on 1 April 1974.  He commanded a Corps in the eastern theater. Upon promotion to Army Commander, he served as the General Officer Commanding-in-Chief Western Command, and retired on 1 June 1979.

Post-retirement 
Upon retirement, Gill chose to reside in Chennai, where he was a trustee of various institutions set up by his father. He died on 30 May 2001.

Dates of rank

Notes

References

British Army personnel of World War II
Recipients of the Padma Bhushan in civil service
Indian generals
Generals of the Indo-Pakistani War of 1971
Recipients of the Param Vishisht Seva Medal
Royal Engineers officers
Indian recipients of the Military Cross
1922 births
2001 deaths
British emigrants to India
Defence Services Staff College alumni